Beerwah State High School (often abbreviated to Beerwah High School, Beerwah High or simply BSHS) is a government-owned secondary school in Beerwah, Queensland, Australia that was established in 1992.

Faculties
Subject offerings at Beerwah State High School are organised around nine faculties. Each of these faculties is led by a Head of Department who is responsible for the quality of teaching, learning and assessment within their area of responsibility.
 Business Education and Information Technology Communications
 Communications
 Health and Physical Education
 Home Economics
 Industrial Technology
 Mathematics
 Science
 Social Science
 The Arts

Specialist programs
Beerwah State High School offers three specialist programs: Athletics Extension Program, Music Extension Program and in 2012, an iLearn Program (which failed spectacularly). In 2017, a "bring your own device" program was introduced. The program still runs in Semester 2 of 2019 and usage of the network is slowly increasing across the school.

Location and facilities

Beerwah State High School is located on Roberts Road. The school is located next to the local swimming pool, which serves as the venue for swimming training and the annual Swimming Carnival. Located within the school is a purpose-built assembly hall and indoor stadium, which hosts school assemblies, as well as interschool sporting events and physical education classes. The school also has a performing arts centre, which is used for school performances as well as for performing arts and dance classes. The school also features purpose-built chemistry laboratories, graphics and woodworking rooms and art facilities.

School sporting houses
Each house has a staff member as a house leader and two students as house captains.

Parents & Citizens Association
Beerwah State High School has a well established Parents and Citizens Association which works within the school community to enhance learning outcomes. The P&C Association also operates the school uniform shop and canteen.

Glass House Coalition of State Schools

Beerwah State High School is a member of the Glass House Coalition of State Schools, a partnership between schools in the Sunshine Coast Hinterland area.

References

External links
 

Public high schools in Queensland
Schools in South East Queensland
Educational institutions established in 1992
1992 establishments in Australia